Meyer from Berlin (German: Meyer aus Berlin) is a 1919 German silent comedy film directed by Ernst Lubitsch and starring Lubitsch, Ossi Oswalda and Ethel Orff. It was part of the Sally series of films featuring Lubitsch as a sharp young Berliner of Jewish heritage. It was Lubitsch's penultimate film as an actor, after 1920 he devoted himself entirely to screenwriting and directing.

Synopsis
Sally Meyer, a young Berliner, persuades his Doctor to convince his wife that he is ill, so that he is able to take a holiday in the Austrian Alps in order to pursue women. Meyer dresses up in what he considers Tyrolean attire. However, he mistakenly travels to the Bavarian Alps rather than Austria. Meyer becomes infatuated with Kitty, a young, attractive woman at the hotel where he is staying. His pursuit of her angers many of her other suitors who are also staying at the hotel. In order to impress Kitty, Meyer agrees rather reluctantly to climb Mount Watzmann. While they are approaching the summit, both Meyer's wife and Kitty's fiancée unexpectedly arrive from Berlin.

Cast
 Ernst Lubitsch as Sally Meyer
 Ethel Orff as Paula, his wife
 Heinz Landsmann as Harry
 Trude Troll as Kitty, his bride
 Ossi Oswalda
 Erich Schönfelder

References

Bibliography
 Eyman, Scott. Ernst Lubitsch: Laughter in Paradise. Johns Hopkins University Press, 2000.
 Prawer, S.S. Between Two Worlds: The Jewish Presence in German and Austrian Film, 1910-1933. Berghahn Books, 2005.

External links

1919 films
Films of the Weimar Republic
German silent feature films
1919 comedy films
German comedy films
Films directed by Ernst Lubitsch
Films set in Berlin
Films set in Bavaria
Films set in the Alps
German black-and-white films
UFA GmbH films
Silent comedy films
1910s German films